Joshua Joel Harding (born June 18, 1984) is a Canadian former professional ice hockey goaltender who played in the National Hockey League (NHL) for the Minnesota Wild.

Playing career 
Harding played three seasons of junior hockey in the Western Hockey League (WHL) with the Regina Pats and Brandon Wheat Kings. He won the Del Wilson and Four Broncos Memorial Trophies in 2003 as the WHL's top goaltender and most outstanding player respectively. He represented Canada at the 2004 World Junior Ice Hockey Championships, winning a silver medal. He was selected in the second round, 38th overall, of the 2002 NHL Entry Draft by the Wild. He began his professional career with the Houston Aeros of the American Hockey League (AHL), the Wild's top minor league affiliate. In the 2004–05 season, his rookie season with the Aeros, he posted a 21–16–3 record with a 2.01 goals against average (GAA).

Harding was called up to the Wild on March 8, 2006, after goalie Dwayne Roloson was traded to the Edmonton Oilers. Before being called up, Harding had a 27–8–0 record with a .923% save percentage (second best in the AHL) in the Aeros' 2005–06 season. He finished the season with a 29–8–0 record for the Aeros. He appeared in three games with the Wild in 2005–06, going 2–1–0 with a 2.59 GAA.

Harding began the 2006–07 season with the Aeros, compiling a 17–15–4 record before being recalled by the Wild on January 24, 2007. Harding recorded a 30-save, 5–0 shutout against the Oilers on March 1, 2007, the third shutout of his career.

On October 14, 2007, Harding stopped 37 shots in his first game of the season, shutting-out the Anaheim Ducks 2–0. He compiled an 11–15 record in the 2007–08 NHL season, recording a 2.94 GAA. He played less during the 2008–09 season, going 3–11 but posting an improved 2.21 GAA.

On September 24, 2010, Harding tore the Anterior cruciate ligament (ACL) and medial collateral ligament (MCL) in his right knee in a pre-season game away against the St. Louis Blues that forced him to miss the entire 2010–11 season. Despite this, on July 1, 2011, Harding signed a one-year contract extension with the Wild.

On June 19, 2012, Harding signed a three-year, $5.7 million contract extension with Minnesota. On November 28, 2012, during the 2012–13 NHL lockout, it was reported that Harding had been diagnosed with multiple sclerosis. He kept the ailment (which can cause blurred vision and affect balance and coordination) a secret for over a month after doctors discovered the disease in late September 2012. In his first game back post-diagnosis, on January 20, 2013, Harding stopped all 24 shots he faced in a 1–0 shutout win over the Dallas Stars.

During the first round of the 2013 Stanley Cup playoffs against the Presidents' Trophy-winning Chicago Blackhawks as the eighth seed, Wild starting goaltender Niklas Bäckström injured himself during warm ups before Game 1. Harding would replace him in a 2–1 overtime loss, stopping 35 shots. This brought praise from his teammates as well as opponents for his incredible play despite being affected by multiple sclerosis. The Wild would lose the series 4–1, but Harding would win the Bill Masterton Memorial Trophy in recognition of his efforts.

Harding enjoyed an exceptional beginning of the 2013-14 season, leading the league in goals against average and save percentage through December. But his season ended when he had to be placed on the injured reserve due to a modification of his MS treatment protocol.

Harding was expected to compete for the starting goaltender position for the Wild in the 2014–15 season, but a broken foot suffered in the off-season derailed those plans. Months later, upon being activated from injured reserve, the Wild placed Harding on waivers and assigned him to their AHL affiliate, the Iowa Wild. In his second game of the season playing for Iowa, Harding suffered from dehydration, which was related to his multiple sclerosis, and had to be hospitalized. He subsequently retired from professional hockey and currently works as a high school goalie instructor for the Edina Hornets in Edina, Minnesota.

International play 
Harding made his international debut at the junior level for Canada in the 2004 World Juniors, helping claim a championship silver medal. At the completion of the 2008–09 season, Harding was selected to make his full senior debut with the Canada senior team at the 2009 IIHF World Championship. He helped guide the Canadians to capture a silver medal.

Personal life
Harding was diagnosed with multiple sclerosis in November 2012 while training during the 2012–13 NHL lockout. Harding lives in Edina with his wife Sara and their two children. Through his marriage, Harding has a stepson.

Career statistics

Regular season and playoffs

Awards and honours

Records 
 Houston Aeros' franchise record for saves in a single game (56)

References

External links

Harding's Hope Charity Website

1984 births
Living people
Bill Masterton Memorial Trophy winners
Brandon Wheat Kings players
Canadian expatriate ice hockey players in the United States
Canadian ice hockey goaltenders
Houston Aeros (1994–2013) players
Ice hockey people from Saskatchewan
Iowa Wild players
Sportspeople from Regina, Saskatchewan
Minnesota Wild draft picks
Minnesota Wild players
People with multiple sclerosis
Regina Pats players